Miomantis nairobiensis is a species of praying mantis in the family Miomantidae, native to Africa.

It is named after the city of Nairobi in Kenya.

See also
Mantodea of Africa
List of mantis genera and species

References

N
Insects of Kenya
Mantodea of Africa